Edward Ingersoll (2 April 1817, Philadelphia - 19 February 1893 Germantown, Philadelphia, Pennsylvania) was a United States author.

Biography
He was the son of Mary Wilcocks and politician and writer Charles Jared Ingersoll. He graduated from the University of Pennsylvania in 1835, and was admitted to the bar in 1838, but he never established a legal practice. During the American Civil War, his sympathies were with the South.

Works
 History and Law of Habeas Corpus and Grand Juries (Philadelphia, 1849)
 Personal Liberty and Martial Law (1862)
He edited:
 Hale, Pleas of the Crown
 Addison on Contracts
 Saunders on Uses and Trusts

References

1817 births
1893 deaths
American non-fiction writers
American jurists
University of Pennsylvania alumni
Ingersoll family
Writers from Philadelphia